Khurd and Kalan (Urdu: خرد اور کلاں, Hindi: ख़ुर्द और कलाँ, Punjabi: ਖ਼ੁਰਦ ਅਤੇ ਕਲਾਂ, خرد  تے کلاں) are administrative designations used in India and Pakistan to indicate the smaller (Khurd) and larger (Kalan) segments of a town, village or settlement. They are usually added after place names. For instance, Berote Khurd and Berote Kalan in Abbottabad District in the Khyber-Pakhtunkhwa province, Dangoh Khurd in Una District of Himachal Pradesh and the famous Dariba Kalan jewellery market in Delhi, there was also a smaller street near by, known as Dariba Khurd or Chhota Dariba, both mean small, now known as Kinari Bazaar.

In some parts of the former Maratha territory, the word Budruk is used instead of "Kalan". It is a corruption of the Persian word for "greater". In Manipur, Khullen and Khunou are used.there is also bhucho khurd and bhucho kalan in Bathinda district Punjab India

Adjacent places with Khurd and Kalan combination
This list contains place names that are adjacent to each other having the same first name with Kurd and Kalan as second name respectively.  Alphabetical entries with no red links.

India
 Mehal Khurd and Mehal kalan, Barnala district, Punjab, India
Mundhal Khurd and Mundhal Kalan, Bhiwani district, Haryana, India
 Bhainsru Khurd and Bhainsru Kalan, Rohtak district, Haryana, India
Rani Khurd and Rani Kalan, Pali district, Rajasthan, India
 Haibowal Kalan and Haibowal Khurd, Ludhiana district, India
 Tikri Khurd and Tikri Kalan, Delhi, India
 Jhojhu Khurd and Jhojhu Kalan, Charkhi dadri district, Haryana, India
Urlana Khurd and Urlana Kalan, Panipat district, Haryana, India
Kang Khurd and Kang Kalan, Jalandhar district, Punjab, India
Abiana Khurd and Abiana Kalan, Ropar district, Punjab, India
 Barian khurd and Barian kalan, Hoshiarpur district, Punjab, India

Pakistan
 Berote Khurd and Berote Kalan, Khyber-Pakhtunkhwa, Pakistan
 Buchal Khurd and Buchal Kalan, Chakwal, Punjab, Pakistan

Other solo places with either Khurd or Kalan
This list contains solitary place names that have  either Khurd or Kalan as second name, but without a corresponding adjacent village to complete the pair. Alphabetical entries with no red links.

Afghanistan
 Anjuman-i-Khurd, Afghanistan

India

Andhra Pradesh 
 Ravulapally Khurd
 Thupra Khurd
 Toole Khurd

Bihar 
 Madhaul Khurd

Delhi 
 Dariba Kalan - Dariba Khurd (now known as Kinari Bazaar), Delhi, India
 Dichaon Khurd
 Khera Khurd

Haryana 
 Asan Khurd
 Baliar Khurd (Rewari)
 Berwala Khurd
 Bhattu Kalan
 Dhabi Kalan
 Jhojhu Khurd
 Nanu Khurd

Himachal Pradesh 
 Dangoh Khurd

Jharkhand 
 Kabra Khurd

Karnataka 
 Ugar Khurd

Madhya Pradesh 
 Khardon Kalan
 Lidhora Khurd
 Tillore Khurd
 Soyat Kalan
 Tonk Khurd

Maharashtra 
 Anjani Khurd
 Bavdhan Khurd
 Bhikawadi Khurd
 Ghoti Khurd
 Lahit Khurd

Punjab 
 Akbarpur Khurd
 Bhikhi Khurd
 Dham Talwandi Khurd
 Buttar Kalan, Moga
 Ghuman Khurd
 Jajja Khurd
 Khatkar Kalan
Haibowal khurd, Ludhiana
 Nangal Khurd, Hoshiarpur
 Pakho Kalan
 Rure Ke Kalan
 Rurka Kalan
 Rurkee Kalan
 Talwandi Kalan

Rajasthan 
 Bairathal Kallan
 Dhuan Kalan
 Jonaicha Khurd
 Ramjipura Khurd

Uttar Pradesh 
 Bal Khurd
 Barkachha Khurd
 Bhora Kalan
 Dharoti Khurd
 Dugauli Khurd
 Kaserua Khurd
 Khajuri Khurd
 Kosi Kalan
 Malava Khurd
 Palia Kalan

Pakistan

Khyber Pakhtunkhwa
 Kotli Khurd (Nowshera District), Khyber Pakhtunkhwa, Pakistan

Punjab
 Attock Khurd
 Aujla Khurd
 Chakori Khurd
 Dhool Khurd
 Jamber Khurd
 Jamsher Khurd
 Jataria Khurd
 Khasala Khurd
 Khinger Khurd
 Kotli Khurd (Mandi Bahauddin District)
 Mohla Khurd  
 Multan Khurd
 Nakka Khurd
 Renala Khurd
 Buchal Khurd
 Buchal Kalan

See also
 Pur and Pura

References 

Place name element etymologies
Geography of India
Geography of Pakistan